The Liuyuan–Golmud Expressway, commonly referred to as the Liuge Expressway is a planned expressway that will connect Liuyuan, a town in Guazhou County, Jiuquan, Gansu, People's Republic of China, and Golmud, Haixi Mongol and Tibetan Autonomous Prefecture, Qinghai.

The expressway is a spur or auxiliary line of the  G30 Lianyungang–Khorgas Expressway, and will connect to the main line at Liuyuan. It parallels the route of China National Highway 215, which currently is the only road connection between the two termini.

The expressway will connect the following cities:
Liuyuan, Guazhou County, Jiuquan, Gansu
Dunhuang, Jiuquan, Gansu
Golmud, Haixi Mongol and Tibetan Autonomous Prefecture, Qinghai

References

Chinese national-level expressways
Expressways in Gansu
Expressways in Qinghai